East Durham is a hamlet (and census-designated place) within the town of Durham, which is located in the U.S. state of New York, approximately  above sea level, in Greene County. It has the ZIP Code 12423 and the area code 518.

Attractions
East Durham is known for its Irish heritage and cultural promotion. The town attracts many Irish-American visitors. East Durham contains several significant cultural attractions including:
 Zoom Flume — full service waterpark with many slides rides and pools designed for families
 Woodward Road Stone Arch Bridge — historical bridge listed on the National Register of Historic Places
 Supersonic Speedway — Mini Amusement park with miniature golf, go-karts, batting cages and arcade
 Gavin's Golden Hill House — resort built at the original site of the Full Moon Farm, founded in the 1790s
 Irish Village USA

References

Hamlets in New York (state)
Hamlets in Greene County, New York